HMCS Camrose was a Royal Canadian Navy  which took part in convoy escort duties during the Second World War. She was named for Camrose, Alberta.

Background

Flower-class corvettes like Camrose serving with the Royal Canadian Navy during the Second World War were different from earlier and more traditional sail-driven corvettes.  The "corvette" designation was created by the French as a class of small warships; the Royal Navy borrowed the term for a period but discontinued its use in 1877. During the hurried preparations for war in the late 1930s, Winston Churchill reactivated the corvette class, needing a name for smaller ships used in an escort capacity, in this case based on a whaling ship design. The generic name "flower" was used to designate the class of these ships, which – in the Royal Navy – were named after flowering plants.

Corvettes commissioned by the Royal Canadian Navy during the Second World War were named after communities for the most part, to better represent the people who took part in building them. This idea was put forth by Admiral Percy W. Nelles. Sponsors were commonly associated with the community for which the ship was named. Royal Navy corvettes were designed as open sea escorts, while Canadian corvettes were developed for coastal auxiliary roles which was exemplified by their minesweeping gear. Eventually the Canadian corvettes would be modified to allow them to perform better on the open seas.

Construction
Camrose was ordered on 22 January 1940 as part of the 1939-1940 Flower-class building program. It was laid down by Marine Industries Ltd. at Sorel on 17 September 1940. She was launched on 16 November 1940 and commissioned 30 June 1941 at Sorel. Camrose had three refits during her career, the first being at  Lunenburg in February 1942 until May 1942. The second refit took place at Pictou in April 1943 and took five and a half months to complete, among the work being done was an extension to the fo'c'sle. Her final major refit took place again at Pictou in September 1944.

Service history
Initially assigned to Halifax Force in July 1941, she was transferred to Newfoundland Command in October of that year. She worked as an ocean escort on convoys from St. John's to Iceland until February 1942 when she was laid up for a refit. Upon her return to active service, she returned to Newfoundland Command.

In June 1942 she was reassigned to the Western Local Escort Force (WLEF). In October that year she was sent to the United Kingdom to take on escort duties for convoys supplying Operation Torch. Camrose would spend five months escorting convoys from the UK to Gibraltar. In April she was sent for another refit, only returning to active service after five months. Upon completion of her workups, she was assigned to escort group EG-6 with the Royal Navy.

During this time she escorted convoys from the  UK to Gibraltar or Freetown. While on escort duty in the North Atlantic on 8 January 1944, Camrose was involved in the sinking of  alongside .

In May 1944 she was assigned to Western Approaches Command at Greenock. As part of her invasion duties, she escorted convoys to and from Normandy. In September 1944 she returned to Canada and went for another refit. Upon her resumption of duties in January 1945 she was made part of escort group EG 41 of the Royal Navy out of Plymouth. She served with that group until VE-Day. Camrose took part in the reoccupation of St. Helier in the Channel Islands.

In June 1945 she returned to Canada for good and on 22 July 1945 she was paid off at Sydney, Nova Scotia. After the war she was sold for scrapping in June 1947 and broken up at Hamilton.

References

Flower-class corvettes of the Royal Canadian Navy
1940 ships